ATN is the Sydney flagship television station of the Seven Network in Australia.

ATN may also refer to:

Medicine
Acute tubular necrosis, a medical condition of the kidneys
Asymmetrical tonic neck reflex
Atypical trigeminal neuralgia

Television
Access Television Network, California, US
Aotearoa Television Network,  Māori language television station, New Zealand, 1996–1997
Arabian Television Network, Dubai, United Arab Emirates
Ariana Television Network, Kabul, Afghanistan
Asian Television Network, Canada
ATN Channel, Canada, owned by Asian Television Network

Transportation
Advanced transit network, another name for personal rapid transit
Air Transport International, ICAO airline designator
Anaheim Resort Transportation, or Anaheim Transportation Network
Anniston station (Amtrak station code: ATN), Alabama, United States
Arriva Trains Northern, a former train operator, England
Atherton railway station, Greater Manchester, England (National Rail code)
Australian Transport Network, a former freight railway operator in Australia
 Namatanai Airport, Papua New Guinea, IATA code

Other
Addicted to Noise, former online music magazine
Aeronautical Telecommunication Network
ATN International, a US telecommunications company
Augmented transition network in linguistics
Australian Technology Network, a network of universities in Australia

See also

Ant (name)